Charles Lott may refer to:

Charles Lott, Sr., fictional character in Between (TV series)
Charles "Chuck" Lott, Jr, fictional character in Between (TV series)
Charles Lott (actor) in V/H/S/99
Charles Lott, manager of Keefe, Bruyette & Woods
Charles Lott (basketball) in James Madison Dukes men's basketball statistical leaders
Charles Lott (military officer), see New Zealand Supply Contingent Somalia